The three teams in this group played against each other on a home-and-away basis. The group winner France qualified for the fifth FIFA World Cup held in Switzerland.

Results

 

 

 

 

 

France qualified.

Final Table

Team stats

Head coach: none, selected by committee

Head coach: none, selected by committee, team manager:  Alex Stevenson

Head coach:  Béla Volentik

External links
FIFA official page
RSSSF - 1954 World Cup Qualification
Allworldcup

4
1953–54 in Republic of Ireland association football
qual
1953–54 in Luxembourgian football